Ron McCarthy (3 November 1934 – 20 January 1989) was an Australian rules footballer who played with Footscray in the Victorian Football League (VFL) during the 1950s.

References

External links

1934 births
Australian rules footballers from Victoria (Australia)
Western Bulldogs players
Western Bulldogs Premiership players
1989 deaths
One-time VFL/AFL Premiership players